Hypocrite (Spanish: Hipócrita..!) is a 1949 Mexican thriller film directed by Miguel Morayta and starring Antonio Badú, Leticia Palma, Carmen Molina and Luis Beristáin. The film included the song "Hipócrita".

The film's sets were designed by Francisco Marco Chillet.

Cast
 Antonio Badú as Pepe el sabroso  
 Leticia Palma as Leticia  
 Carmen Molina as Aurora  
 Luis Beristáin as Gerardo 
 Pascual García Peña as Ricardito 
 Elda Peralta as Vendedora de cigarros  
 Francisco Reiguera as Don Simón  
 Wolf Ruvinskis as El rayas  
 Julián de Meriche as El soplón  
 Edmundo Espino as Juanito 
 Ricardo Adalid as Doctor  
 León Barroso as Policía  
 José Chávez as Preso  
 Felipe de Flores as Anunciador 
 Alfonso Díaz Landa
 Emilio Garibay as Leandro  
 Ramón Gay as El ronco  
 María Gentil Arcos as Mamá de Aurora  
 Leonor Gómez as Presa 
 Los Panchos as Cantantes  
 Joaquín Roche as El Argentino, papá de Leticia  
 Hernán Vera as Mesero

References

Bibliography 
 Rogelio Agrasánchez. Carteles de la época de oro del cine mexicano. Archivo Fílmico Agrasánchez, 1997.

External links 
 

1949 films
1940s thriller films
Mexican thriller films
1940s Spanish-language films
Films directed by Miguel Morayta
Mexican black-and-white films
1940s Mexican films